David Sydney Kivell (17 June 1932 – 20 January 2022) was a New Zealand cricketer. He played in six first-class matches for Central Districts from 1952 to 1956.

See also
 List of Central Districts representative cricketers

References

External links
 

1932 births
2022 deaths
New Zealand cricketers
Central Districts cricketers
Cricketers from Napier, New Zealand